Michal Kamenčík (born 2 January 1993 in Prešov) is a Slovak football striker who currently plays for Austrian club SC Frauenkirchen.

Club career
He made his debut for 1. FC Tatran Prešov against FC Nitra on 15 March 2011.

External links
1. FC Tatran Prešov profile

References

1993 births
Living people
Slovak footballers
Association football forwards
Slovak Super Liga players
1. FC Tatran Prešov players
MŠK Rimavská Sobota players
MFK Lokomotíva Zvolen players
Sportspeople from Prešov